Benjamin Kantie Karamoko (born 17 May 1995), known as Ben Karamoko, is an Ivorian footballer who plays as a defender for Bulgarian club Spartak Varna.

Club career
Karamoko is a youth exponent from Saint-Étienne. He made his Ligue 1 debut on 15 February 2015 against Girondins de Bordeaux replacing Paul Baysse at half-time in a 1–0 home win.

On 31 January 2022, Karamoko signed a 1.5-year contract with Charleroi in Belgium.

International career
Karamoko was born and raised in France, and is of Ivorian descent. He debuted for the Ivory Coast U23 in a 5–1 friendly loss to the France U21s in November 2016.

References

1995 births
Living people
French sportspeople of Ivorian descent
Footballers from Paris
Citizens of Ivory Coast through descent
Association football defenders
Ivorian footballers
Ivory Coast under-20 international footballers
French footballers
Ligue 1 players
AS Saint-Étienne players
US Créteil-Lusitanos players
FK Haugesund players
Aalesunds FK players
Sarpsborg 08 FF players
R. Charleroi S.C. players
PFC Spartak Varna players
Eliteserien players
Ivorian expatriate footballers
French expatriate footballers
Expatriate footballers in Norway
Ivorian expatriate sportspeople in Norway
French expatriate sportspeople in Norway
Expatriate footballers in Belgium
Ivorian expatriate sportspeople in Belgium
French expatriate sportspeople in Belgium